Nuclear receptor-binding factor 2 is a protein that in humans is encoded by the NRBF2 gene.

References

Further reading